The 1964 United States Senate election in Rhode Island took place on November 3, 1964. Incumbent Democratic U.S. Senator John Pastore successfully sought re-election, defeating Republican Ronald Legueux with 82.73% of the vote.

Primary elections 
Primary elections were held on September 17, 1964.

Democratic primary

Candidates 
John Pastore, incumbent U.S. Senator

Results

Republican primary

Candidates 
Ronald Legueux, attorney

Results

General election

Results

References

Bibliography

External links

Rhode Island
1964
1964 Rhode Island elections